The Great Plane Robbery may refer to:

 The Great Plane Robbery (1940 film), a film directed by Lewis D. Collins
 The Great Plane Robbery (1950 film), a film directed by Edward L. Cahn